Benna Namugwanya Bugembe (née Benna Namugwanya) is a Ugandan politician. She is the State Minister for Kampala Capital City Authority in the Ugandan Cabinet. She was appointed to that position on 6 June 2016. She concurrently serves as the Mubende District Woman Representative in the 10th Parliament (2016–2021).

Background and education
She was born on 21 September 1967, in modern-day Mubende District. She attended Saint Edwards College, in Bukuumi, in modern-day Kakumiro District, for her O-Level studies. She transferred to Saint Kizito High School Bethany, in Ngugulo, in modern-day Mityana District, for her A-Level education. In 1989, she was admitted to Makerere University, in Kampala, the largest city and capital of Uganda. She graduated in 1992 with a Bachelor of Education. Later in 2006, the same University awarded her a Master of Education. Benna Namugwaya also holds a Diploma in Human Resource Management, obtained from the Uganda Management Institute in 2007 and a Certificate in Administrative Law, awarded by the Law Development Centre in 2009.

Career
Her first job was as a teacher at Alliance High School, serving in that capacity until 1995. Shen transferred to Saint Augustine College, in Wakiso, teaching there from 1996 until 1998.

In 1998, Benna Namugwanya was hired by Mubende District Local Government, as an Inspector of Schools, serving in that capacity for six years. In 2004, she was promoted to the position of Assistant District Education Officer, in Mubende District, serving in that capacity for one year. In 2005, she was again promoted to Acting District Education Officer, serving for two years in that position. She became the District Education Officer in 2007, serving in that capacity until 2010.

In 2011 she entered Ugandan elective politics, by contesting the Mubende District Women's Constituency, under the ruling National Resistance Movement political party ticket. She won and was re-elected in 2016. In the cabinet list, released on 6 June 2016, Namugwanya was named the Minister of State for Kampala Capital City authority Affairs, deputizing Beti Olive Namisango Kamya-Turomwe, the full cabinet minister.

See also
 Cabinet of Uganda
 Parliament of Uganda
 Kampala Capital City Authority

References

External links
 Website of Parliament of Uganda

Living people
Ganda people
Mubende District
Ugandan educators
People from Mubende District
Members of the Parliament of Uganda
Government ministers of Uganda
People from Central Region, Uganda
Place of birth missing (living people)
21st-century Ugandan women politicians
21st-century Ugandan politicians
Women government ministers of Uganda
1967 births
Women members of the Parliament of Uganda